is a Japanese voice actor who is currently affiliated with Arts Vision.  He has voiced in a number of video games with roles such as Ganondorf in The Legend of Zelda, Big the Cat in the Sonic the Hedgehog series, Cervantes de Leon and Rock Adams in Soulcalibur, Gale Lantis in Soul Link, Donkey Kong in the Donkey Kong and Super Mario series and Darun Mister in Street Fighter EX.  In anime, he voices King Yama in Hōzuki no Reitetsu. He has taken over some of the roles from the late Shun Yashiro, Junpei Takiguchi, Masaaki Tsukada, and Tōru Ōhira.

Filmography

Anime

Film

Video games

Tokusatsu

Drama CD

Overseas dubbing

References

External links 
  
 
 

1964 births
Living people
Japanese male video game actors
Japanese male voice actors
Male voice actors from Wakayama Prefecture
20th-century Japanese male actors
21st-century Japanese male actors
Arts Vision voice actors